William Adamson (1863–1936) was a Scottish politician and Chairman of the British Labour Party.

William Adamson may also refer to:
William Agar Adamson (1800–1868), Canadian clergyman and author
William Adamson (Wisconsin politician) (1834–1907), American politician
William C. Adamson (1854–1929), U.S. Representative from Georgia
William Adamson (Cannock MP) (1881–1945), British Labour politician
William Adamson (Australian politician) (1858–1924), member of the Victorian Parliament
Sir William Owen Campbell Adamson (1922–2000), British industrialist
William Adamson, character in Angels & Insects
 William Stuart Adamson (1958–2001), Scottish guitarist, vocalist, and songwriter